The Classic Center is a convention center in Athens, Georgia, United States.  It was opened in 1995.  Located within is Akins Ford Arena at The Classic Center, a large event hall that also serves as a 2,000-seat arena.  The arena is home to the UGA Ice Dawgs hockey team and formerly the Peach State Cats arena football team.  The Classic Center also contains a 2,122-seat theatre.

History

In 1987, the Civic Center Study Committee was created to determine the ideal public assembly facility for the Athens community.  The committee determined that a facility with an 18,000 square-foot ballroom, 28,000 square-foot exhibit hall, and a 2,000-seat theatre was the best option.  The facility was designed over the next few years, and construction began in 1994.  The first phase opened in 1995, and the theatre opened the following year.

In October, 2013, upgrades were approved for the Grand Hall, adding arena-style seating and an ice rink system.  The UGA Ice Dawgs hockey team began playing their home games there starting with the 2014–15 season.  The Grand Hall was referred to as the Classic Center Arena, before being renamed Akins Ford Arena at The Classic Center, after the naming rights were sold to Akins Ford of Winder, Georgia in 2015.

In 2018, it was announced that the American Arena League's Peach State Cats arena football team would be moving to Akins Ford Arena at The Classic Center for the 2019 season.

Classic Center Arena 
In January of 2019, the Classic Center Authority announced their intent to construct the new Classic Center Arena adjacent to the existing site. The new proposed arena is estimated to cost $88.88 million USD (2019) of which $33 million will be funded by the approved 2020 SPLOST Budget. The arena will be connected to the existing Classic Center, the Multimodal Transportation Center and the downtown district via a new elevated walkway. The arena will have a permanent seating capacity of 5,500 and will be expandable up to 7,500 seats for concerts. Construction began on the Classic Center Arena in the spring of 2022 and is set to be completed by early 2023. The hotel that was originally planned as a part of the Classic Center Arena was postponed due to the COVID-19 pandemic. However, The Classic Center Authority has presented a grand vision for the redevelopment of the entire district including a hotel, retirement community, office space, a new judicial center, and a multi-level parkade.

References

External links
 Official website

Indoor arenas in Georgia (U.S. state)
Indoor ice hockey venues in the United States
Sports venues in Georgia (U.S. state)